Selasoma is a genus of horse flies in the family Tabanidae.

Distribution
Mexico, Argentina, Trinidad.

Species
Selasoma tibiale (Fabricius, 1805)

References

Tabanidae
Diptera of South America
Taxa named by Pierre-Justin-Marie Macquart
Brachycera genera